The second season of Yu-Gi-Oh! Duel Monsters, based on the anime by Kazuki Takahashi, premiered in Japan on April 10, 2001, and concluded on March 5, 2002, on TV Tokyo. The English adaptation of this season aired in the United States from November 16, 2002, and concluded on November 1, 2003, on Kids' WB. The season was directed by Kunihisa Sugishima, and written by Junki Takegami, Masashi Sogo, and Shin Yoshida.

This season follows Yugi and Joey as they compete in Seto Kaiba's Battle City tournament, which was organized in an attempt to gather the three Egyptian God Cards. However, Marik Ishtar, and his loyal Rare Hunter servants, also enter the tournament as part of his plan to use the power of the God cards to take over the world.

Between January 24 and December 28, 2004, Funimation released eleven DVD sets for the season under the title "Yu-Gi-Oh! Battle City Duels", containing episodes from the season. The complete season package was released on March 4, 2008. All DVDs were encoded in Region 1. The series was formerly licensed by 4Kids Entertainment in North America and other English-speaking territories, and was formerly distributed by FUNimation Entertainment, Ltd. on North American home video and also formerly distributed by Warner Bros. Television Animation thru North American television rights, when it aired on Kids’ WB. It is now licensed and distributed by 4K Media.

Cast and characters

Japanese

Regular
 Hidehiro Kikuchi as Hiroto Honda
 Hiroki Takahashi as Katsuya Jonouchi
 Kenjiro Tsuda as Seto Kaiba
 Maki Saitoh as Anzu Mazaki
 Shunsuke Kazama as Yugi Mutou/Yami Yugi

Recurring
 Haruhi Terada as Mai Kujaku
 Junkoh Takeuchi as Mokuba Kaiba
 Konta as Rashid Ishtar
 Mika Sakenobe as Shizuka Kawai
 Rica Matsumoto as Ryo Bakura/Yami Bakura
 Ryou Naito as Ryuji Otogi
 Sumi Shimamoto as Isis Ishtar
 Tadashi Miyazawa as Sugoroku Mutou
 Tetsuya Iwanaga as Malik Ishtar

Guest stars
 Daisuke Namikawa as Ryouta Kajiki
 Eiji Takemoto as Takaido
 Hajime Komada as Bandit Keith Howard
 Kouji Ishii as Mask of Darkness
 Maiko Itou as Esper Roba
 Masami Suzuki as Ghost Kotsuzuka
 Norihisa Mori as Satake
 Sakura Nogawa as Isis Ishtar (child)
 Urara Takano as Insector Haga
 Yuu Mizushima as Mask of Light, Rare Hunter
 Yuuichi Nakamura as Dinosaur Ryuzaki

English

Regular
 Amy Birnbaum as Téa Gardner
 John Campbell as Tristan Taylor 
 Wayne Grayson as Joseph "Joey" Wheeler
 Dan Green as Yugi Muto and Yami Yugi/The Pharaoh
 Eric Stuart as Seto Kaiba

Recurring
 Michael Alston Baley as Odion Ishtar
 Maddie Blaustein as Solomon Moto
 Megan Hollingshead as Mai Valentine
 Tara Jayne as Mokuba Kaiba
 Karen Neil as Ishizu Ishtar
 Lisa Ortiz as Serenity Wheeler
 Ted Lewis as Bakura Ryou/Yami Bakura
 J.T. Ross as Marik Ishtar
 Marc Thompson as Duke Devlin

Supporting
 Amy Birnbaum as Bonz
 Maddie Blaustein as Zygor
 Matt Charles as Umbra
 Ted Lewis as Bandit Keith
 Andrew Rannells as Mako Tsunami
 Sam Regal as Rex Raptor and Arkana
 Kayzie Rogers as Ishizu Ishtar (younger)
 Sebastian Arcelus as Espa Roba
 Eric Stuart as Sid
 Carter Cathcart as Lumis, Weevil Underwood

Episode list

DVD releases

References

General

Specific

2001 Japanese television seasons
2002 Japanese television seasons
Duel Monsters (season 1)